The Swedish Church Assembly elections were held on 15 September 2013. All 249 seats in the General Synod of the Church of Sweden were up for election, as well as local governing bodies.

In church elections in Sweden all members of the Church of Sweden over the age of 16 may vote. It takes through proportional representation by lists presented by nominating groups, many of which are political parties or affiliated with political parties. The election is for the governing bodies of the Church of Sweden at the parish, diocese, and national level.

Results

References 

Church of Sweden
Christian church elections
2013 elections in Sweden
2013 in Christianity
September 2013 events in Europe